The list below consists of the reasons delivered from the bench by the Supreme Court of Canada during 1984. This list, however, does not include decisions on motions.

Reasons

Notes

Reasons Of The Supreme Court Of Canada, 1984
Supreme Court of Canada reasons by year